Pharmaceutical Drugs Directorate (PDD) is a Canadian federal authority that regulates small molecule pharmaceutical drugs for human use. Prior to being given market authorization, a manufacturer must present substantive scientific evidence of a product's safety, efficacy, and quality as required by the Food and Drugs Act and Regulations.  It is one of the ten operational directorates of the Health Products and Food Branch, a branch of Health Canada.

See also
European Medicines Agency
Good Manufacturing Practice
Good clinical practice
Informed consent
Institutional review board
International Conference on Harmonisation of Technical Requirements for Registration of Pharmaceuticals for Human Use
Investigational product
Investigator's Brochure

References

Health Canada